David Robb (born 23 August 1947) is a Scottish actor.

Early life
Robb was born in Wandsworth, London, the son of David Robb and Elsie Tilley. He grew up in Edinburgh and was educated there at the Royal High School, where he played Henry II in a school production of Jean Anouilh's Becket.

Career

Film and television
Robb has starred in various British films and television shows, including films such as Swing Kids and Hellbound. He is well known for playing Germanicus in the famous 1976 BBC production of I, Claudius, and as Robin Grant, one of the principal characters in Thames Television's 1981 series The Flame Trees of Thika.

Robb had his big break playing Andrew Fraser MP in the TV miniseries First Among Equals a 1986 adaption of the book of the same name by Jeffrey Archer. The miniseries was a great success on prime time TV in the UK and abroad and also propelled careers of co-stars Tom Wilkinson, Jeremy Child and James Faulkner.

He played Dr Clarkson in the television drama series Downton Abbey. Robb is also the narrator of History Channel's documentary series "Battle Stations".

He had a recurring role in the fantasy television series Highlander: The Series.

Voice work
He has worked extensively on BBC radio drama, including as Charles in the original radio series of Up the Garden Path opposite Imelda Staunton; as Captain Jack Aubrey in the BBC Radio 4 adaptations of the Patrick O'Brian "Aubrey" novels, and as Richard Hannay in several adaptations of the John Buchan novels, including The Thirty-Nine Steps in 2001 and Mr Standfast in 2007. In 2020, BBC Radio 4 Extra rebroadcast his performance from 1985 in E Phillips Oppenheim's mystery thriller The Great Impersonation.

He has also performed as a voice actor for several Star Wars video games.

Theatre
Robb performed in two of Richard Norton-Taylor's Tricycle Tribunal Plays: The Colour of Justice (the dramatised version of the Sir William Macpherson inquiry into the murder of Stephen Lawrence, his family's search for justice, and endemic racism in British police forces), and Half the Picture (a distillation of the Scott Inquiry into Arms-to-Iraq. It was the first play to be performed in the Palace of Westminster); both were directed by Nicolas Kent and performed at the Tricycle Theatre. The productions were broadcast by the BBC.

Accolades
Robb received two "Actors" (Screen Actors Guild Awards) for his role as part of the main cast of Downton Abbey, season 2 and season 4.

Personal life
Robb married the actress Briony McRoberts in 1978. His best man was Lord Michael Jones. Beginning in 2004, he and his wife ran every year in the Edinburgh Marathon to raise money for leukaemia research. McRoberts took her own life on 17 July 2013 (age 56), after a long battle with anorexia and severe depression.

Filmography

References

External links

David Robb at the British Film Institute

1947 births
English male film actors
English male television actors
Living people
Male actors from Edinburgh
People educated at the Royal High School, Edinburgh
Scottish male film actors
Scottish male television actors
Male actors from London
English people of Scottish descent
English male radio actors
Scottish male radio actors
English male video game actors
Scottish male voice actors
English male voice actors
20th-century English male actors
21st-century English male actors
20th-century Scottish male actors
21st-century Scottish male actors